South Woodstock is an unincorporated village and census-designated place (CDP) in the town of Woodstock in Windsor County, Vermont, United States.

A post office was established in South Woodstock in 1828; today, its ZIP code is 05071.  The ZCTA for ZIP Code 05071 had a population of 456 at the 2000 census. The ZCTA includes large areas outside the village district and includes the entire southern portion of the town of Woodstock.

Once a center of sheep husbandry, South Woodstock is split between commercial and residential areas.  Beside the post office, public services in the community include a volunteer fire department;  moreover, Woodstock maintains a local police department.

The South Woodstock Village Historic District was listed on the National Register of Historic Places in 1983. The district includes examples of Greek Revival and Federal architecture from before the American Civil War. Notable buildings include an 1825 school that became a Grange Hall, the South Chapel (1839), and the Perkins Academy (1848).

History
The South Woodstock area was originally settled in the 1770s, with rural agricultural homesteads on local hilltops.  The village, located in a valley, grew around the gristmills of the Cottle brothers, eventually providing a broader array of services to the outlying farmers.  The Cottles built several fine Federal period brick houses in the village, while the Ransom family built and operated shops in the village.  The village's early 19th century character has been maintained in part because it remained away from economically important railroad transport, which affected the local economy until road transport became more common in the 20th century.

See also
National Register of Historic Places listings in Windsor County, Vermont

References

Census-designated places in Vermont
Census-designated places in Windsor County, Vermont
Unincorporated communities in Vermont
Unincorporated communities in Windsor County, Vermont
Historic districts on the National Register of Historic Places in Vermont
National Register of Historic Places in Windsor County, Vermont
Federal architecture in Vermont
Greek Revival architecture in Vermont
Woodstock, Vermont